Wilhelm Friberg (25 July 1865–16 January 1932) was a Swedish football manager and pioneer in Swedish football. He was one of the founders of Örgryte IS, the dominating club in early Swedish football. He was chairman of the club from the start in 1887 to 1926. He was also one of the founders of the Swedish Sport Association, the Swedish Ballgame Association and the Swedish Football Association, of which he was chairman in the later from 1908 to 1917.

References 
 Alsiö, Martin, Frantz, Alf, Lindahl, Jimmy & Persson, Gunnar (2004). 100 år: Svenska fotbollförbundets jubileumsbok 1904-2004, del 2: statistiken. Vällingby: Stroemberg Media Group. .

1865 births
1932 deaths
Swedish football chairmen and investors
Swedish football managers
Sweden national football team managers
Chairmen of the Swedish Football Association
Örgryte IS directors and chairmen